Rhyparida is a genus of leaf beetles in the subfamily Eumolpinae. It is distributed in the Australasian and Indomalayan realms, though some species are also known from the African islands of Madagascar and Seychelles.

Species
The following species are placed in the genus:

 Rhyparida adonarae Jacoby, 1894
 Rhyparida aemula Weise, 1923
 Rhyparida aenea Gressitt, 1967
 Rhyparida aeneopurpurea Gressitt, 1967
 Rhyparida aeneotincta Blackburn, 1889
 Rhyparida aethiops Weise, 1922
 Rhyparida alcyone Lea, 1915
 Rhyparida alleni Lea, 1915
 Rhyparida amabilis Baly, 1867
 Rhyparida ambigua Weise, 1923
 Rhyparida amboinensis Baly, 1867
 Rhyparida amplicollis Blackburn, 1889
 Rhyparida angulata Gressitt, 1967
 Rhyparida angulicollis Baly, 1867
 Rhyparida angustata Jacoby, 1894
 Rhyparida angusticollis Lea, 1915
 Rhyparida antiquula Weise, 1922
 Rhyparida apicalis Jacoby, 1884
 Rhyparida apicipennis Jacoby, 1898
 Rhyparida archboldensis Gressitt, 1967
 Rhyparida artha Maulik, 1935
 Rhyparida aruensis Baly, 1867
 Rhyparida assamensis Jacoby, 1908
 Rhyparida assimilis (Lefèvre, 1890)
 Rhyparida atra Jacoby, 1894
 Rhyparida atra Lea, 1915 (homonym?)
 Rhyparida atrata Macleay, 1884
 Rhyparida audax Gressitt, 1967
 Rhyparida aureovirida Gressitt, 1957
 Rhyparida australis (Boheman, 1858)
 Rhyparida bakeri Weise, 1922
 Rhyparida balyi Jacoby, 1894
 Rhyparida basalis Baly, 1867
 Rhyparida basileptana Medvedev, 2009
 Rhyparida basileptoides Weise, 1923
 Rhyparida basipennis Lea, 1915
 Rhyparida bicolor Jacoby, 1884
 Rhyparida bicostulata Weise, 1922
 Rhyparida biformis Weise, 1922
 Rhyparida bilineata Medvedev, 2010
 Rhyparida bimaculata Jacoby, 1889
 Rhyparida bimaculicollis Lea, 1915
 Rhyparida bimaculipennis Achard, 1914
 Rhyparida biplagiata Baly, 1864
 Rhyparida bivitticollis Lea, 1915
 Rhyparida bivittipennis Lea, 1922
 Rhyparida bosi Medvedev, 2009
 Rhyparida bougainvillea Gressitt, 1967
 Rhyparida bougainvillea bougainvillea Gressitt, 1967
 Rhyparida bougainvillea pruinosa Gressitt, 1967
 Rhyparida brandti Gressitt, 1967
 Rhyparida brassi Gressitt, 1967
 Rhyparida brevicollis Jacoby, 1898
 Rhyparida brevilineata Jacoby, 1898
 Rhyparida brevis Lea, 1915
 Rhyparida bryani Gressitt, 1957
 Rhyparida bryanti Gressitt, 1967
 Rhyparida buechei Medvedev, 2009
 Rhyparida bukejsi Medvedev, 2013
 Rhyparida buxtoni Bryant, 1936
 Rhyparida cacaovora Gressitt, 1967
 Rhyparida caeruleipennis Lea, 1915
 Rhyparida calami Gressitt, 1967
 Rhyparida carinipennis Gressitt, 1967
 Rhyparida carolina Chûjô, 1943
 Rhyparida carolina carolina Chûjô, 1943
 Rhyparida carolina ponapeana Gressitt, 1955
 Rhyparida carolina trukana Gressitt, 1955
 Rhyparida carteri Lea, 1915
 Rhyparida castanea Jacoby, 1884
 Rhyparida celebensis Baly, 1867
 Rhyparida ceramensis Medvedev, 2003
 Rhyparida clypeata Jacoby, 1884
 Rhyparida commutabilis Lea, 1915
 Rhyparida compositae Gressitt, 1967
 Rhyparida condaoensis Medvedev, 2010
 Rhyparida confusa Baly, 1867
 Rhyparida conicicollis Medvedev, 2010
 Rhyparida copei Lea, 1915
 Rhyparida coriacea Jacoby, 1895
 Rhyparida costata Jacoby, 1898
 Rhyparida crassipes Lea, 1915
 Rhyparida cupreata Baly, 1867
 Rhyparida cyclops Gressitt, 1967
 Rhyparida cyrtops Lea, 1921
 Rhyparida decipiens Lea, 1915
 Rhyparida dejecta Gressitt, 1967
 Rhyparida dentipes (Chen, 1935)
 Rhyparida depressa Jacoby, 1895
 Rhyparida didyma (Fabricius, 1775)
 Rhyparida diluta Weise, 1922
 Rhyparida dimidiata Baly, 1861
 Rhyparida dimidiatipennis Baly, 1864
 Rhyparida discopunctulata Blackburn, 1889
 Rhyparida dispar Bryant, 1925
 Rhyparida distincta Baly, 1867
 Rhyparida diversa Baly, 1867
 Rhyparida diversicornis Medvedev, 1995
 Rhyparida dybasi Gressitt, 1955
 Rhyparida elevata Baly, 1867
 Rhyparida elliptica Lea, 1915
 Rhyparida esakii Chûjô, 1943
 Rhyparida eunigripes Moseyko & Medvedev, 2005
 Rhyparida eupallida Moseyko & Medvedev, 2005
 Rhyparida faitsilongi Romantsov & Moseyko, 2016
 Rhyparida fallax Weise, 1923
 Rhyparida fasciata Baly, 1864
 Rhyparida femorata Baly, 1864
 Rhyparida fervidus (Lefèvre, 1885)
 Rhyparida fijiensis Gressitt, 1957
 Rhyparida flava (Clark, 1864)
 Rhyparida flavipennis Lea, 1915
 Rhyparida flavolatera Lea, 1915
 Rhyparida foaensis (Jolivet, Verma & Mille, 2007)
 Rhyparida formosana Aslam, 1968
 Rhyparida forticornis Weise, 1923
 Rhyparida foveicollis Gressitt, 1967
 Rhyparida fraternalis Baly, 1867
 Rhyparida fruhstorferi Jacoby, 1898
 Rhyparida fulvescens Baly, 1867
 Rhyparida fulviceps Baly, 1864
 Rhyparida fulvicornis Jacoby, 1894
 Rhyparida fulvipes Baly, 1867
 Rhyparida fulvolimbata Lefèvre, 1885
 Rhyparida funera Lea, 1922
 Rhyparida fuscosuturalis Lea, 1915
 Rhyparida gazella Gressitt, 1967
 Rhyparida gemmula Gressitt, 1967
 Rhyparida geniculata Baly, 1861
 Rhyparida gilgilensis Gressitt, 1967
 Rhyparida gloriosa Gressitt, 1967
 Rhyparida goilalae Gressitt, 1967
 Rhyparida gorbunovi Medvedev, 2009
 Rhyparida gracilipes Gressitt, 1967
 Rhyparida halticoides Lea, 1915
 Rhyparida hardyi Gressitt, 1967
 Rhyparida hebes Weise, 1922
 Rhyparida helvola Weise, 1922
 Rhyparida herbacea Blackburn, 1889
 Rhyparida himalayana Medvedev, 2010
 Rhyparida horsfieldii Baly, 1867
 Rhyparida humeralis Lea, 1915
 Rhyparida humeronotata Jacoby, 1905
 Rhyparida huona Gressitt, 1967
 Rhyparida hypocrita Weise, 1922
 Rhyparida illaesa Weise, 1922
 Rhyparida impavida Gressitt, 1967
 Rhyparida impressicollis Baly, 1867
 Rhyparida impuncticollis Baly, 1864
 Rhyparida inconspicua Baly, 1867
 Rhyparida indica Medvedev, 2010
 Rhyparida inguinata Weise, 1916
 Rhyparida instabilis Baly, 1867
 Rhyparida insulicola Lea, 1915
 Rhyparida interioris Blackburn, 1889
 Rhyparida intermontana Gressitt, 1967
 Rhyparida iridipennis Jacoby, 1895
 Rhyparida javanensis Baly, 1867
 Rhyparida juvenis Weise, 1916
 Rhyparida kalninsi Medvedev, 2013
 Rhyparida kandavu Gressitt, 1957
 Rhyparida karimui Gressitt, 1967
 Rhyparida katrinae Medvedev, 1995
 Rhyparida khasianensis Jacoby, 1899
 Rhyparida kotoensis Chûjô, 1956
 Rhyparida kuskus Gressitt, 1967
 Rhyparida labiata Baly, 1867
 Rhyparida laddi Gressitt, 1957
 Rhyparida lankana Medvedev, 2010
 Rhyparida lateralis Baly, 1867
 Rhyparida laterivittata Baly, 1867
 Rhyparida leana Gomez-Zurita, 2011
 Rhyparida leyteana (Medvedev, 1995)
 Rhyparida limbata Baly, 1864
 Rhyparida limbatipennis Jacoby, 1895
 Rhyparida lineaticollis Weise, 1923
 Rhyparida lineola Weise, 1913
 Rhyparida lineolata (Weise, 1913)
 Rhyparida lineolata Gressitt, 1967 (homonym?)
 Rhyparida longipes Jacoby, 1894
 Rhyparida lorquinii Baly, 1867
 Rhyparida luteola Fairmaire, 1879
 Rhyparida m-nigrum Weise, 1916
 Rhyparida maai Gressitt, 1967
 Rhyparida malandensis Weise, 1923
 Rhyparida malayana Medvedev, 2010
 Rhyparida margaretae Gressitt, 1967
 Rhyparida margrafi Medvedev, 1995
 Rhyparida mayae Lea, 1915
 Rhyparida medionigra Lea, 1915
 Rhyparida mediorufa Lea, 1915
 Rhyparida mediovittata Lea, 1915
 Rhyparida megalops Lea, 1915
 Rhyparida melanocephala Jacoby, 1898
 Rhyparida melanocholica Jacoby, 1884
 Rhyparida melas Weise, 1922
 Rhyparida melvillensis Lea, 1915
 Rhyparida metallica Jacoby, 1884
 Rhyparida microdentata Medvedev & Takizawa, 2011
 Rhyparida microsticta Lea, 1926
 Rhyparida militaris Lea, 1915
 Rhyparida minuscula Lea, 1915
 Rhyparida minuta Jacoby, 1884
 Rhyparida modesta Gahan, 1900
 Rhyparida moesta Baly, 1867
 Rhyparida montivaga Weise, 1923
 Rhyparida morosa Jacoby, 1884
 Rhyparida nodostomoides Jacoby, 1894
 Rhyparida nigripennis Baly, 1864
 Rhyparida nigripes (Lefèvre, 1885)
 Rhyparida nigriventris Lea, 1922
 Rhyparida nigroaenea Baly, 1864
 Rhyparida nigrocyanea (Clark, 1864)
 Rhyparida nigrosignata Jacoby, 1884
 Rhyparida nitida Clark, 1864
 Rhyparida nodostomoides Jacoby, 1894
 Rhyparida normalis Gressitt, 1967
 Rhyparida notata Weise, 1923
 Rhyparida nucea Baly, 1867
 Rhyparida obliqua Lea, 1922
 Rhyparida obliterata Baly, 1867
 Rhyparida oblonga Bryant, 1957
 Rhyparida obscuripennis Jacoby, 1905
 Rhyparida obsoleta Baly, 1867
 Rhyparida ochroleuca Weise, 1923
 Rhyparida opacipennis Jacoby, 1884
 Rhyparida ophthalmica Lea, 1915
 Rhyparida ornatipennis Medvedev, 2013
 Rhyparida ovalis Baly, 1867
 Rhyparida ovata Lea, 1915
 Rhyparida padma Maulik, 1935
 Rhyparida pallidula Lea, 1915
 Rhyparida pallidus (Lefèvre, 1890)
 Rhyparida pallipes Weise, 1916
 Rhyparida palmarum Gressitt, 1967
 Rhyparida papuana Jacoby, 1905
 Rhyparida parilis Weise, 1923
 Rhyparida parvicollis Lea, 1915
 Rhyparida parvula Baly, 1867
 Rhyparida pascoei Baly, 1864
 Rhyparida paupercula Weise, 1923
 Rhyparida perang Takizawa, 2017
 Rhyparida perpusilla Weise, 1916
 Rhyparida philippina Weise, 1922
 Rhyparida picea Baly, 1867
 Rhyparida picticollis Gressitt, 1967
 Rhyparida pictipennis Jacoby, 1894
 Rhyparida pictipes Weise, 1922
 Rhyparida pilosa Lea, 1915
 Rhyparida placida Baly, 1867
 Rhyparida platyderes Lea, 1915
 Rhyparida plebejus (Lefèvre, 1885)
 Rhyparida polymorpha Lea, 1915
 Rhyparida prosternalis Jacoby, 1894
 Rhyparida polychroma Weise, 1922
 Rhyparida posticalis Blackburn, 1889
 Rhyparida praecellens Weise, 1922
 Rhyparida procerula Weise, 1922
 Rhyparida proxima Weise, 1923
 Rhyparida pruinicollis Gressitt, 1967
 Rhyparida pulchella Baly, 1861
 Rhyparida puncticollis Baly, 1867
 Rhyparida punctissima Fairmaire, 1879
 Rhyparida punctulata Blackburn, 1889
 Rhyparida purana Maulik, 1935
 Rhyparida purpurea Baly, 1867
 Rhyparida quatei Gressitt, 1967
 Rhyparida regina Gressitt, 1967
 Rhyparida regularis Baly, 1864
 Rhyparida reiterata Gomez-Zurita, 2011
 Rhyparida ribbei Jacoby, 1898
 Rhyparida rivularis Jacoby, 1905
 Rhyparida rossi Gahan, 1900
 Rhyparida rudipunctata Gressitt, 1967
 Rhyparida rufa (Clark, 1864)
 Rhyparida ruficeps Lea, 1915
 Rhyparida ruficollis (Clark, 1864)
 Rhyparida rufoflava (Clark, 1864)
 Rhyparida rufoparva Lea, 1926
 Rhyparida rugicollis Gressitt, 1967
 Rhyparida rugosa Bryant, 1949
 Rhyparida rupa Maulik, 1935
 Rhyparida sakisimensis Yuasa, 1930
 Rhyparida sama Maulik, 1935
 Rhyparida sangirensis Jacoby, 1894
 Rhyparida scotti Maulik, 1931
 Rhyparida scutellata Baly, 1867
 Rhyparida sedlaceki Gressitt, 1967
 Rhyparida semiflava Lea, 1915
 Rhyparida semimetallica Gressitt, 1967
 Rhyparida seminigra Lea, 1915
 Rhyparida semiopaca Lea, 1922
 Rhyparida semipurpurea Jacoby, 1898
 Rhyparida sepikana Gressitt, 1967
 Rhyparida seychellensis Maulik, 1931
 Rhyparida signifera Weise, 1922
 Rhyparida simplex (Clark, 1864)
 Rhyparida sinuata Gressitt, 1967
 Rhyparida sobria Gressitt, 1967
 Rhyparida sparsepunctata Medvedev, 2003
 Rhyparida spiridonovi Romantsov & Moseyko, 2016
 Rhyparida spissa Weise, 1922
 Rhyparida straeleni Maulik, 1935
 Rhyparida straminipennis Weise, 1923
 Rhyparida strigicollis Jacoby, 1884
 Rhyparida strigosa (Bryant, 1946)
 Rhyparida striola Weise, 1910
 Rhyparida subaeneicollis Fairmaire, 1879
 Rhyparida subangulata Lea, 1915
 Rhyparida subcostata Jacoby, 1884
 Rhyparida subdeleta Weise, 1914
 Rhyparida sublaevicollis Jacoby, 1884
 Rhyparida submetallica Baly, 1867
 Rhyparida sulawesianum Medvedev, 2009
 Rhyparida sulcata Baly, 1864
 Rhyparida sulcatipennis (Jacoby, 1896)
 Rhyparida sulcipennis (Jacoby, 1904)
 Rhyparida sumptuosa (Baly, 1862)
 Rhyparida suspecta Baly, 1867
 Rhyparida suturalis Jacoby, 1894
 Rhyparida tabida Weise, 1922
 Rhyparida tenuis Lea, 1915
 Rhyparida terminata Jacoby, 1884
 Rhyparida tetraspilota Lea, 1915
 Rhyparida thailandica Medvedev, 2001
 Rhyparida tibiellus (Weise, 1922)
 Rhyparida trapezicollis Fairmaire, 1879
 Rhyparida triangulifera Lea, 1915
 Rhyparida trilineata Baly, 1864
 Rhyparida trinotata Weise, 1916
 Rhyparida tristis Baly, 1864
 Rhyparida trivialis Gressitt, 1967
 Rhyparida tropica Lea, 1915
 Rhyparida tumifrons Baly, 1867
 Rhyparida uniformis Blackburn, 1889
 Rhyparida vagans Lea, 1915
 Rhyparida variipennis Lea, 1915
 Rhyparida vermiculata Gressitt, 1957
 Rhyparida vilis Weise, 1923
 Rhyparida viridana Jacoby, 1884
 Rhyparida viridiaenea (Blanchard, 1853)
 Rhyparida viridipennis Jacoby, 1884
 Rhyparida vittata (Blanchard, 1853)
 Rhyparida vittipennis Baly, 1864
 Rhyparida vulnerata Lea, 1915
 Rhyparida wallacei Baly, 1867
 Rhyparida wallacei palauana Chûjô, 1943
 Rhyparida wallacei wallacei Baly, 1867
 Rhyparida weigeli Medvedev, 2015
 Rhyparida weiseana Medvedev, 1995
 Rhyparida weiseana Gomez-Zurita, 2011 (homonym?)
 Rhyparida wittmeri Medvedev, 2010
 Rhyparida yarrabensis Weise, 1923

Renamed species:
 Rhyparida apicipennis Lea, 1915 (preoccupied by R. apicipennis Jacoby, 1898): renamed to Rhyparida leana Gomez-Zurita, 2011
 Rhyparida basileptoides Chûjô, 1956 (preoccupied by R. basileptoides Weise, 1923): renamed to Rhyparida formosana Aslam, 1968
 Rhyparida bimaculata Jacoby, 1898 (preoccupied by R. bimaculata Jacoby, 1889): renamed to Rhyparida bimaculipennis Achard, 1914
 Rhyparida megalops (Chen, 1935) (preoccupied by R. megalops Lea, 1915): renamed to Rhyparida faitsilongi Romantsov & Moseyko, 2016
 Rhyparida nigripes Jacoby, 1898 (preoccupied by R. nigripes (Lefèvre, 1885)): renamed to Rhyparida eunigripes Moseyko & Medvedev, 2005
 Rhyparida obliterata Weise, 1910 (preoccupied by R. obliterata Baly, 1867): renamed to Rhyparida subdeleta Weise, 1914
 Rhyparida pallida Jacoby, 1898 (preoccupied by R. pallidus (Lefèvre, 1890)): renamed to Rhyparida eupallida Moseyko & Medvedev, 2005
 Rhyparida pallidula Weise, 1922 (preoccupied by R. pallidula Lea, 1915): renamed to Rhyparida weiseana Gomez-Zurita, 2011
 Rhyparida prosternalis Lea, 1915 (preoccupied by R. prosternalis Jacoby, 1894): renamed to Rhyparida reiterata Gomez-Zurita, 2011

Synonyms:
 Rhyparida aterrima Jacoby, 1892: synonym of Cleoporus lateralis (Motschulsky, 1866)
 Rhyparida blackburni Jacoby, 1898: synonym of Rhyparida fulvolimbata Lefèvre, 1885
 Rhyparida howitti Baly, 1877: synonym of Rhyparida ruficollis (Clark, 1864)
 Rhyparida immaculata Jacoby, 1908: synonym of Rhyparida bimaculata Jacoby, 1889
 Rhyparida maculicollis Baly, 1877: synonym of Rhyparida fasciata Baly, 1864
 Rhyparida mastersi Blackburn, 1892: synonym of Rhyparida fasciata Baly, 1864
 Rhyparida mediopicta Blackburn, 1889: synonym of Rhyparida didyma (Fabricius, 1775)
 Rhyparida morosa Jacoby, 1884: synonym of Rhyparida nitida Clark, 1864
 Rhyparida opacicollis Baly, 1867: synonym of Rhyparida impuncticollis Baly, 1864
 Rhyparida phytorella Moseyko & Medvedev, 2005 (replacement name for Rhyparida simplex (Lefèvre, 1885)): synonym of Rhyparida lineolata (Weise, 1913)
 Rhyparida piceitarsis Blackburn, 1889: synonym of Rhyparida flava (Clark, 1864)
 Rhyparida satelles Blackburn, 1889: synonym of Rhyparida ruficollis (Clark, 1864)
 Rhyparida simplex (Lefèvre, 1885) (preoccupied by R. simplex (Clark, 1864)): synonym of Rhyparida lineolata (Weise, 1913)
 Rhyparida voeltzkowi Achard, 1914: synonym of Rhyparida subdeleta Weise, 1914

Species moved to Deretrichia:
 Rhyparida alternata Baly, 1864
 Rhyparida andaiensis Jacoby, 1894 (as andannensis?)
 Rhyparida approximata Baly, 1867
 Rhyparida bipustulata Baly, 1867
 Rhyparida brunnea Baly, 1867
 Rhyparida frontalis Baly, 1867
 Rhyparida inornata Baly, 1864
 Rhyparida intermedia Baly, 1867
 Rhyparida laevifrons Jacoby, 1884
 Rhyparida laticollis Baly, 1867
 Rhyparida plebeja Jacoby, 1894
 Rhyparida rothschildi Jacoby, 1894
 Rhyparida semipunctata Baly, 1867
 Rhyparida separata Baly, 1867
 Rhyparida sordida Baly, 1864
 Rhyparida sulcicollis Baly, 1867
 Rhyparida tibialis Baly, 1867
 Rhyparida timorensis Jacoby, 1894
 Rhyparida variabilis Baly, 1867

Species moved to Tricliona:
 Rhyparida armata Jacoby, 1889
 Rhyparida bengalensis Jacoby, 1908
 Rhyparida quinquemaculata Jacoby, 1887
 Rhyparida raapi Jacoby, 1899

Species moved to other genera:
 Rhyparida picta Baly, 1867: Moved to Phainodina

References

External links
 Genus Rhyparida Baly, 1861 at Australian Faunal Directory

Eumolpinae
Chrysomelidae genera
Beetles of Africa
Beetles of Asia
Beetles of Australia
Beetles of Oceania
Taxa named by Joseph Sugar Baly